The 1934 NC State Wolfpack football team was an American football team that represented North Carolina State University as a member of the Southern Conference (SoCon) during the 1934 college football season. In its first season under head coach Hunk Anderson, the team compiled a 2–6–1 record (1–3–1 against SoCon opponents) and was outscored by a total of 112 to 44.

Schedule

References

NC State
NC State Wolfpack football seasons
NC State Wolfpack football